Holy Islamville is an unincorporated community in York County, South Carolina, United States. Founded by Mubarak Ali Gilani in 1983, it is a branch of Muslims of America. The community is currently in the process of expanding the Baitun-Noor Holy Khanqah, the shrine of the Sufis.

Unincorporated communities in York County, South Carolina
Unincorporated communities in South Carolina
Populated places established in 1983
Intentional communities in the United States
Islam in the United States
1983 establishments in South Carolina